is a railway station in the city of Aomori, Aomori Prefecture, Japan, operated by the East Japan Railway Company (JR East) and the Hokkaido Railway Company (JR Hokkaido).

Lines

Station layout
The conventional Ōu Main Line has a single island platform, serving two tracks. In addition to regular Ōu Main Line trains, the station serves two round-trips per day of Aoimori Railway trains, as well two round-trips of the irregular Resort Asunaro (direct to Noheji and the Ōminato Line). Upon the opening of the Tōhoku Shinkansen extension on 4 December 2010, the station became the southern terminus of Hakuchō Limited express services to Hakodate via the Tsugaru Kaikyō Line, which ceased upon commencement of the Hokkaidō Shinkansen in March 2016.

The Shinkansen portion of the station, opened on 4 December 2010, consists of two elevated island platforms serving four tracks. The platforms are 263 meters long and capable of handling 10-car trains. The station has a Midori no Madoguchi staffed ticket office.

Previously, Shin-Aomori Station was an unmanned station consisting of a single side platform for bi-directional traffic.

Platforms

History

Shin-Aomori Station opened on 1 November 1986 as a station on the Japanese National Railways (JNR). With the privatization of JNR on 1 April 1987, it came under the operational control of JR East. Work on a new station building began in July 2007, and was completed in 2010 ahead of the opening of the Tōhoku Shinkansen extension on 4 December.

Shinkansen services replaced the former Hakucho and Super Hakucho limited express services from March 2016.

Passenger statistics
In fiscal 2016, the conventional portion station was used by an average of 3,619 passengers daily (boarding passengers only) and the Shinkansen portion by 4,033 passengers. The passenger figures for previous years are as shown below.

Surrounding area

Aomori-Nishi High School
Shinjo Elementary School
Galatown Aomori West Mall
Aomori Kenko Land

See also
 List of Railway Stations in Japan

References

External links

  

Stations of East Japan Railway Company
Railway stations in Japan opened in 1986
Railway stations in Aomori Prefecture
Ōu Main Line
Tōhoku Shinkansen
Hokkaido Shinkansen
Aomori (city)